The central governor is a proposed process in the brain that regulates exercise in regard to a neurally calculated safe  exertion by the body. In particular, physical activity is controlled so that its intensity cannot threaten the body’s homeostasis by causing anoxic damage to the heart muscle. The central governor limits exercise by reducing the neural recruitment of muscle fibers. This reduced recruitment causes the sensation of fatigue. The existence of a central governor was suggested to explain fatigue after prolonged strenuous exercise in long-distance running and other endurance sports, but its ideas could also apply to other causes of exertion-induced fatigue.

The existence of a central governor was proposed by Tim Noakes in 1997, but a similar idea was suggested in 1924 by Archibald Hill.

In contrast to this idea is the one that fatigue is due to peripheral "limitation" or "catastrophe." In this view, regulation by fatigue occurs as a consequence of a failure of homeostasis directly in muscles.

History

Archibald Hill 
The 1922 Nobel Prize in Physiology or Medicine winner Archibald Hill proposed in 1924 that the heart was protected from anoxia in strenuous exercise by the existence of a governor.

This hypothesis was disregarded and further research upon exercise fatigue was modeled in terms of it being due to a mechanical failure of the exercising muscles ("peripheral muscle fatigue"). This failure was caused either by an inadequate oxygen supply to the exercising muscles, lactic acid buildup, or total energy depletion in the exhausted muscles.

Tim Noakes 
Tim Noakes, a professor of exercise and sports science at the University of Cape Town, in 1997 has renewed Hill’s argument on the basis of modern research.

In his approach, the power output by muscles during exercise is continuously adjusted in regard to calculations made by the brain in regard to a safe level of exertion. These neural calculations factor in earlier experience with strenuous exercise, the planning duration of the exercise, and the present metabolic state of the body. These brain models ensure that body homeostasis is protected, and an emergency reserve margin is maintained. This neural control adjusts the number of activated skeletal muscle motor units, a control which is subjectively experienced as fatigue. This process, though occurring in the brain, is outside conscious control.

Other uses 

Noakes created the idea of the central governor in the context of prolonged endurance running. However, he has noted that the central processes involved might also underlie the existence of other kinds of fatigue:

In support of this, placebos (which must be mediated by a central process) have a powerful effect upon not only fatigue in prolonged exercise, but also upon short term endurance exercise such as sprint speed, the maximum weight that could be lifted with leg extension, and the tolerance of ischemic pain and power when a tourniqueted hand squeezes a spring exerciser 12 times.

Criticisms 
The existence of a central governor over physiology has been questioned since ‘physiological catastrophes’ can and do occur in athletes (important examples in marathons have been Dorando Pietri, Jim Peters and Gabriela Andersen-Schiess). This suggests that humans can over-ride ‘the central governor’. Moreover, a variety of peripheral factors in addition to those such as lactic acid build up can impair muscle power and might act to protect against "catastrophe". Another objection is that models incorporating conscious control also provide an alternative explanation  (see Noakes’ reply).

Exercise fatigue has also been attributed to the direct effects of exercise upon the brain such as increased cerebral levels of serotonin, reduced level of glutamate secondary to uptake of ammonia in the brain, brain hyperthermia, and glycogen depletion in brain cells.

See also 
 Exercise
 Fatigue (medical)
 Health management system
 Muscle weakness
 VO2 max

Notes 

Exercise physiology
Endurance games
Cardiology
Human homeostasis
Muscular system